Willis L. Van Dusen (born 1952 or 1953) is a businessman and former politician in Astoria, Oregon, United States, who served as mayor of Astoria from 1991 through 2014. Originally elected to the city council in 1985, Willis served as a councillor for six years before being elected mayor. He took the oath of office in January 1991 and was re-elected every four years since that time, most recently re-elected in 2010.  In 2014, he announced that he had decided to retire at the end of his term and not run for reelection again.  He was succeeded by Arline LaMear, who was sworn in as mayor on January 5, 2015.

Life
Willis Van Dusen has very close roots to Astoria and is one in a long line of Van Dusens to represent the City of Astoria. In the 1850s, future President Ulysses S. Grant visited Van Dusen's ancestor, Adam Van Dusen, when he came to Astoria. More recently, Willis Van Dusen greeted former President Bill Clinton who visited Astoria in May 2008 while campaigning for Hillary Clinton in the Democratic Primaries.

In addition to serving as Mayor of Astoria, Willis Van Dusen owns a local soft-drink bottling franchise, Van Dusen Beverages. Van Dusen is a graduate of Astoria High School's Class of 1971 and earned a degree in business from the University of Oregon in 1975.

Movie
Shortly after he was elected mayor, Willis Van Dusen appeared in the movie Free Willy, which was filmed in Astoria in 1993. He played the role of "Fish Vendor."

References

Oregon city council members
Mayors of places in Oregon
Politicians from Astoria, Oregon
Living people
Year of birth uncertain
Year of birth missing (living people)